Bhai-Bhai is a 1970 Bollywood suspense drama film directed by Raja Nawathe. It had music by Shankar Jaikishen with lyrics by Hasrat Jaipuri. The film stars Sunil Dutt (in double role), Asha Parekh, Mumtaz, Mehmood and Pran.  It performed "above average" at the box office.

The story revolves around Sunil Dutt, playing the role of a writer, whose character from his story seemingly comes to life killing people. This puts him under suspicion from the police. The film had Sunil Dutt in a double role.

Cast
Sunil Dutt as Ashok / manish(double role)
Asha Parekh as Taaj
Mumtaz as Bijli
Mehmood as Johnny
Pran
Jeevan
Raj Mehra
Aruna Irani
Madan Puri
Mukri
Leela Chitnis
Manmohan Krishna
Iftekhar
Mohan Choti
Sunder
Asit Sen

Soundtrack
The film had music composed by Shankar Jaikishan with lyrics written by Hasrat Jaipuri and S. H. Bihari. The playback singing was provided by Lata Mangeshkar, Asha Bhosle and Mohammed Rafi.

Song list

References

External links
 

1970 films
1970s Hindi-language films
1970 drama films
Films scored by Shankar–Jaikishan
Indian drama films
Films directed by Raja Nawathe